The Spirit of Metal webzine is an online collection of bands from Heavy Metal and its subgenres. SoM is similar to the Encyclopaedia Metallum. The difference between the two online collection portals is that Spirit of Metal also included in its encyclopedia metal bands that have their roots in hardcore.
The site originated in France.

Since the founding of the website in 2003, Spirit of Metal is available in 9 languages (French, German, English, Russian, Spanish, Italian, Chinese, Polish and Portuguese).

In addition to the tape archive, Spirit of Metal acts as a messaging service. So band messages are added, interviews conducted, concert and album reviews published, which are corrected by the professional staff and published thereafter. Interviews, reviews and news are published in French or English. Spirit of Metal also sells its own T-shirts. Many well-known musicians, including Sharon Janny den Adel (Within Temptation), Edu Falaschi (Angra), Janne Wirman (Children of Bodom), Dani Filth (Cradle of Filth), Simone Simons (Epica) and Mikael Stanne (Dark Tranquillity) Members have the opportunity to discuss bands and other topics in the forum, and can send private messages outside the forum.

Another difference with the Metal Archives is that, for some time now,  bands with a questionable political ideology cannot be added to Spirit of Metal. Politically-oriented bands (especially extreme right-wing groups) that were registered prior to this control measure are marked with a crossed swastika.

In addition, Spirit of Metal is comparable to portals such as Vampster and Powermetal.de. Since 2003 there is also a portal that specializes in rock bands. This is called Spirit of Rock webzine. According to the official Facebook presence of the music archive, Spirit of Metal represents the world's largest online encyclopedia of Metal and rock.

References

External links 
Official Homepage (Spirit of Metal) (French, German, English, Polish, Italian, Spanish, Russian, Chinese, Portuguese)
Official Homepage (Spirit of Rock) (all the above languages except Polish)
Spirit of Metal at Facebook
Spirit of Metal  (Alexa Rank)

Internet properties established in 2003
Heavy metal publications
Music archives
Online music magazines published in Germany
Online databases